The North Atlantic Fellas Organization (NAFO, a play on NATO, the North Atlantic Treaty Organization) is an Internet meme and social media movement dedicated to countering Russian propaganda and disinformation about the 2022 Russian invasion of Ukraine. It has been categorised as a form of information warfare.

In addition to posting irreverent commentary about the war and memes promoting Ukraine or mocking the Russian war effort and strategy ("shitposting"), the group also raises funds for the Ukrainian military and other pro-Ukrainian causes. The representation of a NAFO "Fella" is a Shiba Inu dog, often used as an avatar and sometimes described as a "cartoon dog" or a "group of Shiba Inu soldiers". According to The Economist, "NAFO's flippancy obscures its role as a remarkably successful form of information warfare."

History 
The meme was created in May 2022, when Twitter artist Kamil Dyszewski (under the handle @Kama_Kamilia) started adding modified pictures of a Shiba Inu dog (the "Fella") to photographs from Ukraine. NAFO, such as it is, was founded on 24 May 2022 with a tweet. The Shiba Inu breed has had a significant presence in online culture since at least 2010 under the 'doge' meme.

After some time, Dyszewski began creating custom "Fellas" for others who donated to the Georgian Legion. "Fellas", which comes from "fellow", is considered by NAFO to be a gender-neutral term. Current and retired service members from Ukrainian and NATO militaries, as well as Eastern Europeans and Eastern European diaspora, are heavily represented among those participating in the group's activities. The German paper Berliner Kurier estimates that the group includes "tens of thousands" of associates as of September 2022. The Fellas make appearances in various edited still images and "TikTok-style videos of Ukrainian troops set to dance music soundtracks", and are "spliced into war footage to mock Russia's military and praise Ukraine's soldiers". NAFO terms its opponents (online and on the battlefield) vatniks. Some NAFO members reportedly have an "especial focus" on defusing the "whataboutism" defense of the Russian invasion.

In June, the group rose to mainstream prominence after an interaction on Twitter between Russian diplomat Mikhail Ulyanov and a number of NAFO accounts with cartoon dogs as avatars. After Ulyanov claimed that the 2022 Russian invasion was justified by Ukraine allegedly shelling civilians in the Donbas since 2014, the following exchange ensued between Ulyanov and fella @LivFaustDieJung:

This response was seized upon by other NAFO members. The phrase "you pronounced this nonsense", or simply "pronouncing nonsense", came to be used by NAFO as a quick and dismissive way to mock pro-Russian accounts.

Per the Wall Street Journal, the group’s pro-Ukrainian fundraising and merchandise sales are believed to total "over $1 million ... but no official tally is kept" so the claim cannot be independently verified. In August 2022, NAFO raised money for Signmyrocket.com, a website where people pay to have custom messages written on Ukrainian artillery shells and equipment. Task & Purpose described the result, a 2S7 Pion cannon with the inscription "Super Bonker 9000" and a sticker of a baseball bat on the barrel with the inscription "NAFO-Article 69" as "self-propelled artillery that is bringing internet memes into terrestrial form".  

Per The Economist, "Another popular slogan—'What air defence doing?'—pokes fun at the failure of Russian air defences to prevent an attack on Saky air base in Crimea on August 9th." The origin of the meme was a quote tweet in "dubious English" by @200_zoka (with airdefense idiosyncratically combined into one word) reacting to photos of smoke billowing up from the distant airfield.

German state-supervised broadcaster ZDF rejects the notion that NAFO is an operation of the U.S. Central Intelligence Agency; "the fact that 'Nafo' is financed by the CIA is just a self-deprecating joke among Twitterers."

Reception 
NAFO was described as a "Western civil society response to Russian campaigns" by Tobias Fella, a political scientist training Bundeswehr soldiers in dealing with social media. It is part of a larger "battle for sovereignty of interpretation" on shared online spaces. According to Politico, "To delve into NAFO is to get a crash course in how online communities from the Islamic State to the far-right boogaloo movement to this rag-tag band of online warriors have weaponized internet culture."

American media studies professor Jaime Cohen argues that the NAFO movement "is an actual tactical event against a nation state". British-Lebanese journalist Oz Katerji asserts that NAFO "has hampered Russia's propagandists and made them look absurd and ridiculous in the process". Ukraine's Ambassador to Australia and New Zealand Vasyl Myroshnychenko noted that the grassroots, decentralized nature of NAFO is an important part of its strength.

According to one analysis, "The largely English-language memes have kept Western attention on Ukraine's war—attention that is vital given the importance of Western arms to Ukrainian forces." American Lt. Col. Steve Speece with the Modern War Institute at West Point argues "Meme content shared in NAFO channels ... is almost exclusively English language and presumably not intended for Russian audiences ... These fora exist to generate content for the entertainment and status of their own members. Yet even Western national security policy is sometimes explicitly driven by the emotions—like outrage—cultivated in online communities." Speece argues that online agitators like NAFO take the role of bad cop in a good cop/bad cop dynamic with policy makers.

According to the Berliner Kurier, "Like real NATO, NAFO has an Article 5 duty of assistance. This means that each fella can call on the others for help if they are under attack or encounter serious disinformation. For this, the NAFO members use the hashtag #NAFOarticle5 and then receive support from other fellas." An analyst  at the German Council on Foreign Relations assessed it as being "very effective".

Russia has deployed troll farms effectively in the past; its confused reactions to NAFO may stem from its "turgid ideological propaganda about Ukraine". According to the cyber warfare unit of the U.S. Army, the 780th Military Intelligence Brigade, "For an online community like NAFO, hostile mention from an official propaganda outlet of its target is evidence its ridicule is achieving the desired effect."

Recognition
On 28 August 2022, the official Twitter account of the Ministry of Defense of Ukraine tweeted its appreciation of NAFO, with an image of missiles being fired and a "Fella" dressed in a combat uniform, hands on face, in a posture of appreciation.

High-ranking military and civil officials in Ukraine and NATO countries have changed their Twitter avatars to a Fella. Ukrainian Minister of Defense Oleksii Reznikov temporarily changed his Twitter avatar to a Fella commissioned in his honor, on 30 August 2022. 

Others have included former President of Estonia Toomas Hendrik Ilves, current Prime Minister of Estonia Kaja Kallas, Lithuanian Foreign Minister Gabrielius Landsbergis, United States Representative Adam Kinzinger, and United States Army Major General Patrick J. Donahoe.

See also 
 Doge (meme)
 Great Translation Movement
 Kilroy was here, a historic war meme
 Patron (dog)
 Saint Javelin
 Vatnik (slang)

References

Non-independent references

External links

 NAFO website
 
 

 
Internet memes related to the 2022 Russian invasion of Ukraine
Dogs in popular culture
Internet trolling
Military humor
Political Internet memes